The Sterling Mountain Fire Observation Tower and Observer's Cabin is a historic fire observation station located on Sterling Mountain in Sterling Forest State Park at Greenwood Lake in Orange County, New York. The tower is a prefabricated structure built by the Aermotor Corporation and provided a front line of defense in preserving the Ramapo Mountains from the hazards of forest fires. The observer's cabin is of light frame construction, sheathed with board and batten siding stained brown. 

In 1968 an access road was constructed to facilitate repairs, with both the tower and cabin being upgraded that same year. The station became a volunteer-run reserve lookout in 1989 when New York State ended its fire observation program.

It was added to the National Register of Historic Places in 2006.

See also
National Register of Historic Places listings in Orange County, New York

References

Government buildings on the National Register of Historic Places in New York (state)
Towers completed in 1922
Houses completed in 1934
Buildings and structures in Orange County, New York
Fire lookout towers on the National Register of Historic Places in New York (state)
Palisades Interstate Park system
Ramapos
National Register of Historic Places in Orange County, New York
1922 establishments in New York (state)